Valtteri Filppula (born 20 March 1984) is a Finnish professional ice hockey forward for Genève-Servette HC of the National League (NL).

Filppula won the Stanley Cup with the Detroit Red Wings in 2008. He has previously played with the Red Wings, Tampa Bay Lightning, Philadelphia Flyers, and New York Islanders. He led Finland to a gold medal at the 2022 Winter Olympics and the 2022 IIHF World Championship, which made him the first Finnish member of the Triple Gold Club.

Playing career

Detroit Red Wings (2005–2013)

Filppula was drafted by the Detroit Red Wings in the third round, 95th overall, in the 2002 NHL Entry Draft. He started his hockey career with the Jokerit organization and secured his place in the SM-liiga team in the 2003–04 season as an offensive forward. He won the SM-liiga silver medal with Jokerit in 2005 and was set to become the team's number one center for the next season. However, Filppula moved to North America to play for the Grand Rapids Griffins of the American Hockey League (AHL), the top minor league affiliate of the Detroit Red Wings. He was selected to play for PlanetUSA in the 2005–06 AHL All-Star Game.

On 15 December 2005, Filppula made his NHL debut with the Red Wings, becoming the first Finnish player ever to play an NHL game for Detroit. He scored his first NHL goal on 28 October 2006, against former Red Wing goaltender Manny Legace in a game against the St. Louis Blues. He then scored his first playoff career goal in Game 1 of the 2007 Stanley Cup playoffs against the Calgary Flames on 12 April 2007, his first post-season game.
Filppula continued playing for the Red Wings and scored 36 points in his third season for the team in the 2007–08 season. He won his first Stanley Cup when Red Wings defeated the Pittsburgh Penguins in six games in the 2008 Stanley Cup Finals. He scored the second goal for Detroit in the decisive sixth game of the series, in which the Red Wings won 3–2.

On 30 July 2008, Filppula signed a five-year, $15-million contract extension with Detroit, avoiding salary arbitration.

On 21 September 2012, Filppula signed with his former team club Jokerit in Finland due to the 2012–13 NHL lockout that halted play. He returned to the Red Wings after the lockout, as his contract with Jokerit was signed to last as long as the lockout did.

Tampa Bay Lightning (2013–2017)

On 5 July 2013, Filppula signed a five-year, $25 million contract as an unrestricted free agent with the Tampa Bay Lightning. On 1 December 2014, Filppula recorded his 200th NHL assist in a 6–3 Tampa Bay Lightning win over the New York Rangers. On 6 January 2015, Filppula played in his 600th NHL game in a 4–2 Lightning win over the Montreal Canadiens.

Philadelphia Flyers (2017–2018)
The Lightning dealt Filppula on 1 March 2017, hours before the NHL Trade Deadline, to the Philadelphia Flyers, along with a 2017 4th-round draft pick and a conditional 7th-round draft pick, in exchange for defenseman Mark Streit. Streit was immediately traded to the Pittsburgh Penguins for a draft pick. The moves allowed for Tampa Bay to clear Filppula's $5 million salary cap hit and protect another player in the 2017 NHL Expansion Draft due to his no-trade clause. Filppula reportedly rejected a transaction two days earlier that would've sent him to the Toronto Maple Leafs along with Lightning teammate Brian Boyle. Filppula made his Flyers debut on 2 March, a 2–1 shootout win against the Florida Panthers in which he scored the tying goal and was awarded the game's third star. Prior to the 2017–18 season the Flyers named Filppula an alternate captain along with Andrew MacDonald.

New York Islanders (2018–2019)
On 1 July 2018, Filppula signed a one-year $2.75 million contract with the New York Islanders. In the 2018–19 season, Filppula proved his versatility with the Islanders, used in all forward positions in posting 17 goals and 14 assists for 33 points in 72 games for the playoff-bound club. In the post-season, Filppula helped the Islanders advance to the second round collecting four assists in 8 games.

Return to Detroit (2019–2021)

On 1 July 2019, Filppula signed a two-year, $6 million contract with the Red Wings. On 1 February 2020, Filppula appeared in his 1,000th career NHL game, becoming the eighth Finnish-born player to reach the milestone.

Genève-Servette HC (2021–present)
On 24 August 2021, Filppula joined Genève-Servette HC of the National League (NL) on a one-year deal for the 2021–22 season.

International play

Filppula was named captain of Finland at the World under-18 Championships in Slovakia in 2002. At the 2004 World Junior Ice Hockey Championships, he scored four goals and five assists in seven games to be selected as a tournament all-star. He was selected to play for Finland at the 2010 Winter Olympics, which eventually resulted in a bronze medal win over Slovakia. He scored the empty net goal in the 5–3 win.

On 7 January 2014, Filppula was named to the team Finland roster for the 2014 Winter Olympics in Sochi. On 6 February 2014, Filppula suffered an ankle injury in Tampa Bay's 4–1 loss to the Toronto Maple Leafs. The injury was diagnosed as a non-displaced fracture and he was expected to miss at least three weeks, forcing him to miss the Olympics.

On 2 March 2016, Finland named Filppula to its 2016 World Cup of Hockey roster. He scored Finland's only goal of the tournament in the game against North America.

Filppula served as captain of the gold medal-winning 2022 Finnish Olympic team and the gold medal-winning 2022 IIHF World Championship team. He was also honored as a flag bearer for the Parade of Nations at the Olympic opening ceremony.

With his wins in 2022, Filppula became the first Finnish player and thirtieth overall to enter the Triple Gold Club.

Personal life
Filppula is the younger brother of Ilari Filppula.

Career statistics

Regular season and playoffs

International

Awards and honors

References

External links

 

1984 births
Living people
Detroit Red Wings draft picks
Detroit Red Wings players
Finnish expatriate ice hockey players in Switzerland
Finnish expatriate ice hockey players in the United States
Finnish ice hockey centres
Genève-Servette HC players
Grand Rapids Griffins players
Ice hockey players at the 2010 Winter Olympics
Ice hockey players at the 2022 Winter Olympics
Jokerit players
Medalists at the 2010 Winter Olympics
Medalists at the 2022 Winter Olympics
Olympic gold medalists for Finland
Olympic bronze medalists for Finland
Olympic ice hockey players of Finland
Olympic medalists in ice hockey
Sportspeople from Vantaa
Philadelphia Flyers players
Stanley Cup champions
Tampa Bay Lightning players
Triple Gold Club